Adamyan or Adamian is an Armenian surname derived from the given name Adam. The Western Armenian equivalent is Atamian (Ադամեան). Notable people with the surname include:

Adamyan or Adamian
 Andranik Adamyan, Armenian football manager
 Armen Adamyan (born 1967), Armenian footballer and manager
 Arshak Adamian (1884–1956), Armenian conductor, composer and pedagogue
 Ashot Adamyan
 Diana Adamyan
 Gregory H. Adamian  (born 1926), president emeritus and chancellor of Bentley College
 Hovannes Adamian (1879–1932), Armenian inventor
 Karlen G. Adamyan
 Leyla Adamyan 
 Petros Adamian (1849–1891), Armenian actor
 Samvel Adamyan, Armenian football manager
 Sargis Adamyan (born 1993), Armenian-German footballer
 Vadym Adamyan (born 1938), Ukrainian mathematician and theoretical physicist

Atamian
 Charles Garabed Atamian (1872–1947), Ottoman-born French painter of Armenian descent
 Evangelia Atamian better known as Marika Ninou, (1918–1957), Armenian-Greek rebetiko singer

See also 
 Adamians, early Christian sect

References 

Armenian-language surnames
Patronymic surnames
Surnames from given names